Pella Palace (Пеллинский дворец) was a summer residence built during the reign of Catherine II of Russia for her grandson, future emperor Alexander. It was situated on the left bank of the Neva River, 30 km east of Saint Petersburg, where the town of Otradnoye now stands. If completed, it would have been Russia's largest imperial palace. Pella, partially built in 1785-1789, has been razed to the ground by Catherine's son, Paul I of Russia. Not only the buildings disappeared, but very few images of it survived the Battle of the Palaces: existing knowledge of Pella relies on a few facade elevations and watercolors by Giacomo Quarenghi and an elaborate drawing on Catherine's fan, also based on Quarenghi's drafts.

Beginning
Extremely fond of her grandson Alexander, the Empress liked to think about him as the new Alexander the Great. In November 1784 she purchased the estate of Pallila (also called Ivanovskaya Myza) from the heirs of Ivan Neplyuev. Ivanovskaya has already been a well-appointed estate with two-storey wooden manor, four guest houses and various services. The park contained a pool, connected with Neva with a canal, and was modestly adorned with statues and follies. Catherine stayed in the manor occasionally before major construction commenced.

In 1785 Ivanovskaya was renamed to Pella, an allusion to the birthplace of Alexander the Great and the illustrious future intended for Alexander. In April 1785 Catherine wrote to Melchior Grimm that she planned to set up an English landscape park around Pella; in fact, earlier, on March 13, 1785, she authorized Ivan Starov's draft for a spacious, proper imperial palace. Groundbreaking ceremony was celebrated on July 17, 1785 when work has already been underway.

Execution

Potemkin's favorite architect, Ivan Starov, was instructed to recreate the palace of the ancient rulers of Macedon in the Neoclassical style and to suitably adorn the residence with antique objets d'art. Giacomo Quarenghi provided regular consultancy to Catherine, liaising with Starov; English gardener John Bush was appointed to do the landscaping in 1787.

In order to accomplish the task, Starov obtained copies of Étienne-Louis Boullée's grandiose designs for rebuilding the Versailles Palace. His design for Pella, modeled on Boullée's unexecuted project, pleased the Empress so much that she declared to her European correspondents: "all my summer residences are mere huts if you compare them with Pella, which rises like Phoenix from ashes". Catherine called Pella "rising phoenix", alluding to Alexander's ascension to power after her own death. Pella, designed by Ivan Starov, was the largest Russian imperial palace of the period, and more complex in composition than anything in Russia. According to the design, the core palace was to be encircled with eight auxiliary residences and sixteen smaller service buildings in Palladian style, connected with double-colonnaded galleries.

The Empress invested 823 thousand roubles before the Russo-Turkish War of 1787–1792 broke out and construction works were suspended (on 3 November 1789). By this time, nine core buildings and two of five connecting galleries were completed; the service buildings had not been started. The project consumed 25 million bricks, 1,383 cubic sazhen of granite cladding; palaces have already been equipped with 350 heating ovens and furniture made by David Roentgen.

Destruction

Demolition, authorized by Paul on December 7, 1796 actually commenced in May 1797, starting with connecting galleries. By January 1801 six of nine building were completely demolished, three other were razed during Alexander's reign.

The surviving post office building that was built by Starov in 1780s, was not part of the palace proper. It was designed to mirror Pella layout in a smaller scale, with curvilinear galleries and service building flanking the main rotunda hall. In the 19th century most of these galleries were demolished; the main hall was deformed by installing new chimneys and new window openings.

References

Sources

Online references
 Palaces and Manors of the Ladoga Region

Palaces in Russia
Royal residences in Russia
Houses completed in 1785
Former palaces
Demolished buildings and structures in Russia
Palladian architecture
Neoclassical architecture in Russia
Neoclassical palaces
Buildings and structures in Leningrad Oblast
Buildings and structures demolished in 1797
Buildings and structures demolished in the 19th century
Cultural heritage monuments of federal significance in Leningrad Oblast